Phillip David Chen (21 October 1946 – 14 December 2021) was a Jamaican bassist. He was one of England's most utilized session bassists during the 1970s and 1980s, including Jeff Beck, and the Rod Stewart band from 1977 to 1980, but is probably best known for his later work with Ray Manzarek and Robby Krieger of the Doors.

Life and career
Chen was born on 21 October 1946. and was of Chinese ancestry. He spent much of his early life in Kingston, Jamaica, and attended St. George's College. He played in the Vikings in the 1960s, and in bands on the club circuit in Kingston before relocating to England. 

Chen worked with numerous nationally known musicians during his career. He first joined Jimmy James and the Vagabonds in 1965, before realizing that he could make much more money as a session musician. He went on to record with Donovan on his album Cosmic Wheels (1973), Jeff Beck (identified as "Phil Chenn" on the album cover) on Blow by Blow (1974) and parts of Wired, and Joan Armatrading on Back to the Night (1975).He also joined the Butts Band, led by Doors guitarist Robby Krieger and drummer John Densmore, and recorded their 1974 self-titled debut with them. He was also known for having been a member of Brian May's Star Fleet Project, along with Eddie Van Halen, in 1983.

Chen joined Rod Stewart band performing on three of his most famous albums, "Blondes Have More Fun", "Foot Loose & Fancy Free" and "Foolish Behaviour" and performed on some of his biggest hits such as "Da Ya Think I'm Sexy?", "Young Turks" and "Hot Legs", as well as appearing in the video for the latter. 

Other musicians with whom Chen performed and recorded include Pete Townshend, Eric Clapton, Ray Charles, Desmond Dekker, Jerry Lee Lewis, Bob Marley, Jimmy Cliff, Jackson Browne, Dave Edmunds, and Linda Lewis, among others.

In 2004, he joined Krieger and Doors keyboardist Ray Manzarek in their Doors reformation, Manzarek–Krieger. He was also a member of their Doors tribute band Riders on the Storm.

In August 2014, it was announced that Chen would receive the Order of Distinction in October that year.

Personal life
Chen died from cancer on December 14, 2021, at the age of 75.

References

External links

Phil Chen at Answers.com
 
 

1946 births
2021 deaths
Musicians from Kingston, Jamaica
Jamaican bass guitarists
Jamaican expatriates in England
Jamaican people of Chinese descent
British people of Chinese descent
Hakka musicians
Recipients of the Order of Distinction
Jamaican session musicians
Jamaican expatriates in the United States